Rakotoarimanana is a Malagasy surname.

People
 Joelison Emanoela Rakotoarimanana, Malagasy politician
 Joseph Rakotoarimanana (born 1972), retired Malagasy athlete
 Patrice Rakotoarimanana, Malagasy politician

Malagasy-language surnames
Surnames of Malagasy origin